Spaanderman is a surname. Notable people with the surname include:

Jaap Spaanderman (1896–1985), Dutch pianist, cellist, and conductor
Llane Spaanderman (born 1986), Australian rules footballer